The Lewis H. Mills House is a house located in northwest Portland, Oregon  listed on the National Register of Historic Places.

See also
 National Register of Historic Places listings in Northwest Portland, Oregon

References

1916 establishments in Oregon
Colonial Revival architecture in Oregon
Georgian Revival architecture in Oregon
Historic district contributing properties in California
Houses completed in 1916
Houses on the National Register of Historic Places in Portland, Oregon
Northwest Portland, Oregon
Portland Historic Landmarks